Hammershus is a medieval era fortification at Hammeren on the northern tip of the Danish island of Bornholm.
The fortress was partially demolished around 1750 and is now a ruin. It was partially restored around 1900.

History

Hammershus was Scandinavia's largest medieval fortification and is one of the largest medieval fortifications in Northern Europe. The fortification was erected in the 13th century and consists of the base castle residence and features a grand tower called the "mantel" tower. Hammershus Fortress features a  perimeter wall around the castle grounds.

During a number of successive struggles between the kings of Denmark versus the Archbishopric, the fortress served as a refuge for the Archbishops including Bishop Jens Grand. It was conquered by the king's army on a number of occasions, e.g. 1259, 1265, 1319, and 1325. In 1521, it was taken by king Christian II, who used it to imprison Bishop Jens Andersen Beldenak of Funen. The fortress was conquered by forces of Lübeck the same year.

In 1658, Hammershus was occupied by Swedish forces, but a rebellion on the island terminated the Swedish rule. The rebels, led by Jens Pedersen Kofoed, shot the Swedish commandant Johan Printzenskiöld, and the Danish peasants traveled to Copenhagen to return the island to the king of Denmark. Corfitz Ulfeldt and his wife Leonora Christina were imprisoned in Hammershus 1660–1661. In 1743 Hammershus was abandoned as a stronghold. The remains were preserved in 1822. Since the major excavation and restoration work in the late 1800s, there has been a continuous maintenance of the ruins.

Description

Visitors to Hammershus have views of the coastline and the sea surrounding Bornholm. South of the castle is a deep valley, water filled hollows, and dense forest. There are a number points before arriving at castle where enemies could be stopped. The castle was built with box-like rooms surrounded by rings of fortifications. Each provided an additional layer of protection from invaders. Two natural spring ponds provided fresh drinking water on the side of the castle.

Art
Because of the unusual light on Bornholm, and because it has only four hours of darkness in summer, many of Denmark's earliest artists chose to paint views of Hammerhus. One of the most notable is by Anton Eduard Kieldrup from 1848, which is on display at the Bornholm Art Museum.

Gallery

References

Other sources
 Bornholm Tourist Guide; personal visits of author to Hammershus and the "Kunstmuseum".
 This article is partially based on the corresponding articles on the Swedish and German Wikipedias, accessed on July 20, 2006.

External links
Hammershus Visitor Center website

Buildings and structures completed in the 13th century
Ruins in Denmark
Ruined castles in Denmark
Former castles in Denmark
Forts in Denmark
Buildings and structures in Bornholm
Tourist attractions in the Capital Region of Denmark